Uth Records (or Ufone Uth Records) was a 2011 Pakistani music television reality show presented by the Ufone. Louis ‘Gumby’ Pinto was the producer of the show, he left Coke Studio when he offered for this show. Omran ‘Momo’ Shafique was also producer of the show with Gumby. Zeeshan Parwez directed the show.

See also 
Acoustic Station
Music of Pakistan
 Coke Studio (Pakistan)
 Nescafé Basement

References

External links 
 

Pakistani music television series
2011 Pakistani television series debuts
Pakistani reality television series